Ethosheia Hylton is an English screenwriter and film director. She is known for her work on In The Silence (short film) and Dọlápọ̀ Is Fine (short film) which won the HBO Short Film Competition at American Black Film Festival.

In 2018 Ethosheia was presented the inaugural European Academy Gold Fellowship For Women. The award, sponsored by Swarovski, offered a year-long mentorship scheme from the Academy. Driven by stories from untold voices and about community and culture, Ethosheia's work Brixton Rock, an adaptation of author Alex Wheatle's book of the same name, is being turned into a feature film. She is currently directing Ackley Bridge (TV Series on Channel 4).

Filmography

References

Living people
Year of birth missing (living people)